The Rural Municipality of Shellbrook No. 493 is a rural municipality (RM) in the Canadian province of Saskatchewan within Census Division No. 16 and  Division No. 5. It is located in the north-central portion of the province west of the City of Prince Albert.

History 
The RM of Rozilee No. 493 was originally incorporated as a rural municipality on January 1, 1913. Its name was changed to the RM of Shellbrook No. 493 on October 20, 1923.

Geography 
The boundaries of the municipality extend north by Prince Albert National Park, to the west by Canwood No. 494, Saskatchewan, to the southwest by Leask No. 464, Saskatchewan, to the south by Duck Lake No. 463, Saskatchewan, to the east by Buckland No. 491, Saskatchewan, and to the northeast by Paddockwood No. 520, Saskatchewan. There are several First Nations Indian reserves bordering it on the northeast, between it and Paddockwood.

Communities and localities 
The following urban municipalities are surrounded by the RM.

Towns
Shellbrook

The following unincorporated communities are within the RM.

Organized hamlets
Crutwell
Holbein

Demographics 

Government 
The RM of Shellbrook No. 493 is governed by an elected municipal council and an appointed administrator that meets on the first Wednesday of every month. The reeve of the RM is Doug Oleksyn while its administrator is Hugh Otterson. The RM's office is located in Shellbrook.

Transportation 
Rail
Big River Branch C.N.R—serves Prince Albert, Shellbrook, Clonfert, Canwood, Polwarth
Blaine Lake Branch C.N.R—serves Prince Albert, Buckland, Crutwell, Holbein, Shellbrook, Parkside, Kilwinning

Roads
Highway 693—intersects Highway 3
Highway 4—serves Shellbrook, Saskatchewan changes name to Highway 55
Highway 240—serves Shellbrook, Saskatchewan
Highway 40—intersects Highway 3

See also 
List of rural municipalities in Saskatchewan

References 

Shellbrook
Division No. 16, Saskatchewan